Mas-wrestling is one of the wrestling ethnosports, which has a tournament at every edition of the Ethnosport Cultural Festival held annually in Turkey.

Women

Men

Sources

Recurring sporting events established in 2016
Annual sporting events in Turkey
Events at multi-sport events
Strength athletics